Radhanpur is one of the 182 Legislative Assembly constituencies of Gujarat state in India. It is part of Patan district and is numbered as 16-Radhanpur . It is one of the seven seats which make up Patan Lok Sabha constituency.

Currently, Raghubhai Desai of INC is the Member of Legislative Assembly from Radhanpur.

List of segments
This assembly seat represents the following segments,

 Radhanpur Taluka
 Santalpur Taluka – Entire taluka except village – Kesargadh.
 Sami Taluka (Part) Villages – Dadar, Dhadhana, Sherpura, Ranavada, Kharchariya, Gochnad, Bismillabad, Babri, Chandarni, Rampura, Jakhel, Godhana, Daudpur, Mandvi, Bhamathal, Mubarakpura, Sajupura, Nana Joravarpura, Matrota, Mota Joravarpura, Varana, Mahmadpura, Baspa, Kanij, Dadka, Umedpura, Lalpur, Adgam, Vahedpur, Sukhpura, Ved, Rupnagar, Bhadrada, Gajdinpura, Samsherpura, Sonar, Vaval, Jalalabad, Gujarvada, Jhilvana, Kathivada, Vaghpura, Rafu, Badarganj, Koddha, Anvarpura, Nani Chandur.

Members of Vidhan Sabha
1962 - Porania Devkaran Jivanlal (Congress)
1967 -	R.K. Jadeja (SWA) 
1972 - Nirmala Jhaveri (Congress) 
1985 - Khodidan Zula (Congress) 
2007 - Shankarbhai Chaudhary, Bharatiya Janata Party
2012 - Nagarji Thakor, Bharatiya Janata Party

Election results

2022

2019 Bypoll

2017

2012

1985 Vidhan Sabha
 Khodidan Bhimjibhai Zula (INC) : 50,574 votes
 Valjibhai Gangaram Thakker (BJP) : 6,788

See also
 List of constituencies of the Gujarat Legislative Assembly
 Patan district

References

External links
 

Assembly constituencies of Gujarat
Patan district